Gliozzi is an Italian surname. Notable people with the surname include:

Ettore Gliozzi (born 1995), Italian footballer
Ferdinando Gliozzi (born 1940), Italian physicist

See also
Gliozzi Peak, a mountain of Ellsworth Land, Antarctica

Italian-language surnames